Live in Australia is a 2008 live album by American rock musician Chris Isaak. The album was recorded in Melbourne, Australia in 2006.

Track listing

Personnel
Chris Isaak - lead vocals, guitar
Hershel Yatovitz - lead guitar, vocals
Rowland Salley - bass, vocals
Scott Plunkett - keyboards, accordion, vocals
Kenney Dale Johnson - drums, vocals
Rafael Padilla - percussion

References

Chris Isaak albums
2008 live albums
Universal Music Group live albums